Anousheh is an Iranian given name for males and females. People named Anousheh include:

 Anousheh Ansari, Iranian-American engineer 
 Anousheh Khalili, Iranian-American singer-songwriter

Alternative spellings: Anushae, Anusheh, Anushay,  Unushay, Anushè

Anoushak, means immortal in ancient Iran. Anoushak Rappan- Anousheh Ravan ( Immortal Entity )